Marvin Johnson is the name of:

Marvin Johnson (American football) (1927–1981), for the Los Angeles Rams and Green Bay Packers
Marvin Johnson (basketball) (born 1956) in 1978 NBA draft
Marvin Johnson (boxer) (born 1954), light heavyweight boxer who won a bronze medal at the 1972 Olympics
Marvin Johnson (footballer, born 1968), English footballer for Luton Town
Marvin Johnson (footballer, born 1990), English footballer for Sheffield Wednesday